Joseph Morewood Staniforth (better known as J.M. Staniforth) (1864 – 21 December 1921) was a Welsh editorial cartoonist best known for his work in the Western Mail, Evening Express and Sunday weekly the News of the World. Staniforth has been described as "...the most important visual commentator on Welsh affairs ever to work in the country."

Biography 
Staniforth was born in Gloucester in 1863, the son of a Sheffield tool repairer named Joseph Staniforth. His family moved to Cardiff in South Wales in 1870, and after leaving school at 15, Staniforth trained as a lithographic printer for the Western Mail before becoming an art reviewer. A promising young artist, he studied at the Cardiff School of Art, which was run from rooms above the Royal Arcade in the town centre. His classmates included the sculptor Goscombe John. Staniforth originally worked primarily in paint, but slowly moved from brush work to inks where he found a talent for cartoons and caricature. He started publishing cartoons in 1889 after being spotted by the Western Mail'''s editor Henry Lascelles Carr.

Usually published in the Western Mail, Staniforth's drawings and cartoons covered political and social unrest in Wales from 1890 through to the First World War of 1914-1918. Although his cartoons followed editorial lines, with editor Carr appearing in several stating his own opinion, Staniforth himself veered more towards the more tolerant Liberal-Labour movement and would attack both capitalist coal owners and the socialist unions.

In 1911 the then Chancellor of the Exchequer, David Lloyd George, commissioned Staniforth to produce a piece of artwork to commemorate the investiture of Prince Edward as Prince of Wales at Caernarfon Castle. Lloyd George kept the artwork, in pencil and watercolour, and hung it in his study.

Staniforth was replaced at the Western Mail by Leslie Illingworth upon his death in 1921.

 Samples of political cartoons 

Dame Wales
One of Staniforth's more famous creations was "Dame Wales" (or Mam Cymru''), a middle-aged woman dressed in the Welsh national costume, along with Welsh hat, who would embody Wales in a similar way that other cartoonists would use Britannia to symbolise Britain or the British Empire. Staniforth stated in a 1906 interview that he felt that Wales needed a counterpart to John Bull who was used in cartoons to represent England, and after discussions with a colleague, Staniforth created what he believed would be a characteristic Welsh dame. Dame Wales was normally the voice of reason in Staniforth's cartoons and is often pictured attempting to discourage others from making decisions that would damage the country. When a spoken caption was required, Dame Wales would often be depicted talking in a working class valleys vernacular, which stands out against the language used by the more educated figures of authority she challenges. Other cartoonists would later take up the figure of Dame Wales, and would keep the same image in their work.

Cartoons depicting Dame Wales

References

National personifications
Artists from Cardiff
Welsh editorial cartoonists
Welsh journalists
1863 births
1921 deaths